Fariman (also Romanized as Farīmān; also known as Farīmūn) is a city and capital of Fariman County, Razavi Khorasan Province, Iran. At the 2006 census, its population was 32,610, in 8,203 families.

Notable people
 Khodadad Azizi, born in Fariman; Iranian Football player
 Hassan Ghazizadeh Hashemi, born 21 March 1959 in Fariman; Minister of Health and Medical Education of President Hassan Rouhani
 Morteza Motahhari, 31 January 1919 in Fariman - 1 May 1979; an Iranian cleric, philosopher, lecturer, and politician
 Hadi Khorsandi, born 22 July 1943 (age 75) in Fariman; poet, and writer of Persian socio-political issues.

Gallery of the dam

Gallery

References

External links

Populated places in Fariman County
Cities in Razavi Khorasan Province